An Antarctic Protected Area is an area protected under the Antarctic Treaty System. There are three types of Protected Areas under this system:

 Antarctic Specially Protected Area (ASPA) under the Agreed Measures for the Conservation of Antarctic Fauna and Flora (1964 onwards) and Annex V to the Environment Protocol (2002)
 Antarctic Specially Managed Area (ASMA) under Annex V of the Environment Protocol (2002)
 Historic Site or Monument (HSM)

Guidelines for scientists and other visitors have been developed to protect these areas.

References

External links 
 Official database of Antarctic Protected Areas at the website of the Antarctic Treaty System.

 
Protected Areas
Antarctica